Jafarabad (also Romanized as Ja‘farābād; also known as Ja‘farābād-e Nūq and Ja‘far Abad Noq) is a village in Rezvan Rural District, Ferdows District, Rafsanjan County, Kerman Province, Iran. At the 2006 census, its population was 318, in 78 families.

References 

Populated places in Rafsanjan County